Chaudhry Naveed Ashraf (born 1949) is a Pakistani politician who had been a Member of the Provincial Assembly of the Punjab from August 2018 till January 2023.

References

Living people
Punjab MPAs 2018–2023
Pakistan Muslim League (N) MPAs (Punjab)
1949 births